Boym Partners is design firm based in New York City.

History
Boym Partners was founded in 1986 by Constantin Boym in New York City and is run by Constantin and Laurene Leon Boym, who joined the firm in 1995. The firm is a multi-disciplinary design studio. The firm designs products and environments for their clients, in addition to creating self-produced artistic works. They have designed tableware for companies including Authentics and Alessi, as well as watches for Swatch, lighting for Flos, and showrooms for Vitra.

Souvenirs
Boym Partners have also designed collectible objects. In 1997 they began producing a line called Souvenirs for the End of the Century, which marked iconic events from the 20th-century. They also produced the Buildings of Disaster project—a series of architectural miniature souvenirs depicting buildings that were the site of a historical disaster. Objects created included the Unabomber's cabin, the Oklahoma City Federal Building, Chernobyl, and the Lorraine Motel. After 9-11, the designers added more items to the line, including The Pentagon and the World Trade Center. Following the 2008 Financial collapse, Boym Partners produced a line of replicas based upon skyscrapers that were not built due to the crash.

The projects developed by Boym Partners between 1985 and 2002 were the focus of the 2002 Princeton Architecture Press book Curious Boym: Design Works. In 2009 Boym Partners received the National Design Award in Product Design category. A monograph about the firm's history and work, Keepsakes: A Design Memoir, was also published by Pointed Leaf Press in 2015.

Museums
Projects developed by Boym are housed in the permanent collection of the Museum of Modern Art in New York and the San Francisco Museum of Modern Art. and Boym-designed exhibitions have also been shown in the National Building Museum in Washington DC and the Cooper Hewitt, Smithsonian Design Museum. Boym Partners also designed the souvenir renderings of the Cooper-Hewitt's mansion home, using emoticons in the design.  In 2009, their exhibition Timeless Objects, in which they coated everyday objects with bronze-like material to give them an artistic feel, was shown at the ExperimentaDesign in Lisbon, the Wright Gallery in Chicago, and the Cooper-Hewitt.

References

1986 establishments in New York City
American industrial designers